The Ipsos Bucharest Challenger is a defunct tennis tournament held in Bucharest, Romania that has been held in 2007 and 2008. The event was part of the ATP Challenger Tour and has been played on outdoor clay courts.

Past finals

Singles

Doubles

External links 
 
Romanian Tennis Federation
ITF Search 

ATP Challenger Tour
Tennis tournaments in Romania
Clay court tennis tournaments